Dakshinkhan Adarsha is a union parishad of Dhaka Metropolitan North, Dhaka District, Dhaka, Bangladesh. It is bounded by Gazipur Sadar Upazila on the north, Khilkhet Thana on the south, Uttarkhan Thana on the east and uttara and Shahjalal International Airport on the west. Population 5,29,500 (Approximate). Average literacy 68.87%; male 73.57%, female 63.06%.

History
Dakshinkhan Thana was formed in 2006. The thana was named after Dakshinkhan Adarsha Union Parishad.

Facilities
The union has two madrasas; the Dakshinkhan Darul Uloom Madrasa and the Holan Islamiyyah Dakhil Madrasa. Darul Uloom is currently headed by Mawlana Haji Muhammad Alim Uddin and both madrasas each contain orphanages holding 500 orphans. There is another small orphanage in Holan known as the Holan Nuraniyyah Yatimkhana which holds 100 orphans. There are five mosques; the Chairman Bari Mosque, the Dakhsinkhan Bazar Mosque, the Bidurpara Mosque, the Holan Nuraniyyah Mosque and the North Borua Mosque. The Union also has three public graveyards; Madhubag, Holan and Azampur.

Administration

Neighbourhoods
Dakshinkhan is divided into 18 elaka (areas). They are listed below:

Chairmen

References

Sources
 Bangladesh Bureau of Statistics; Field report of Dakshinkhan Thana (2008)
 Bangladesh Population Census (2001)

Dhaka District
Unions of Dhaka City